The Gur languages, also known as Central Gur or Mabia, belong to the Niger–Congo languages. They are spoken in the Sahelian and savanna regions of West Africa, namely: in most areas of Burkina Faso, and in south-central Mali, northeastern Ivory Coast, the northern halves of Ghana and Togo, northwestern Benin, and southwestern Niger. A few Gur languages are spoken in Nigeria. Additionally, a single Gur language, Baatonum, is spoken in Benin and in the extreme northwest of Nigeria. Three other single Gur languages, the Tusya, Vyemo and Tiefo languages, are spoken in Burkina Faso. Another unclassified Gur language, Miyobe, is spoken in Benin and Togo. In addition, Kulango, Loma and Lorhon, are spoken in Ghana, Ivory Coast and Burkina Faso. Additionally, a few Mossi speakers are in Senegal, and speakers of the Dagaare language are also found in Cameroon. The Samu languages of Burkina Faso are Gur languages.

Typological features
Like most Niger–Congo languages, the ancestor of Gur languages probably had a noun class system; many of today's languages have reduced this to a system of nominal genders or declensions or no longer have a class system. A common property of Gur languages is the verbal aspect marking. Almost all Gur languages are tonal, with Koromfé being a notable exception. The tonal systems of Gur languages are rather divergent. Most Gur languages have been described as following the model of a two tone downstep system, but the languages of Oti-Volta branch and some others have three phonemic tones.

History of study
Sigismund Wilhelm Koelle first mentions twelve Gur languages in his 1854 Polyglotta Africana, which represent ten languages in modern classification. Notably, he correctly identified these languages as being related to one another; his 'North-Eastern High Sudan' corresponds to Gur in modern classification.

The Gur family was previously called Voltaic, following the French name (langues) Voltaïques (named after the Volta River). It was once considered to be more extensive than it is often regarded today, including the Senufo languages and a number of small language isolates. The inclusion of Senufo within Gur has been rejected by many linguists, including Tony Naden. Williamson and Blench place Senufo as a separate branch of Atlantic–Congo, while other non-Central Gur languages are placed somewhat closer as separate branches within the Savannas continuum.

Kleinewillinghöfer (2014) notes that the closest relatives of Gur appear to be several branches of the obsolete Adamawa family, since many "Adamawa" languages in fact share more similarities with various (Central) Gur languages than with other Adamawa languages. He proposes that early Gur-Adamawa speakers had cultivated guinea corn and millet in a wooded savanna environment.

Classification 
The regions on the map denote regional distribution of the Central Gur languages. The tree-diagram below denotes the relations between these languages and their closest relatives:

The position of Dogoso–Khe in Southern Gur is not clear; it is not closely related to other members of the branch.

Bodomo (2017)
Bodomo (2017) refers to the entire Central Gur group as Mabia. The term Mabia is a portmanteau of the two lexical innovations ma- 'mother' + bia 'child'.

The following is a classification of the Mabia (or Central Gur) languages from Bodomo (2017), as cited in Bodomo (2020). Bodomo divides Mabia into three primary branches, namely West, East, and Central.

 Mabia
 East (or Gurunsi, Grũsi)
 Kasem
 Sisaala
 Kabiye
 West (or Gurma)
 Bassari
 Konkomba
 Moba
 Central
 Dagaare
 Dagaare
 Wali
 Birifor
 Safaliba
 North
 Moore
 Mid-Central
 Mabiene
 Frafra (Nankanè)
 Nabit
 South
 Dagbani
 Mampruli
 Nanuni (a dialect of Dagbani)
 Kusaal
 Kusaal (Kusasi)
 Talni
 Buli–Konni
 Buli
 Konni
 Hanga–Kamara
 Hanga
 Kamara

The term Mabia, instead of Gur, is also used by Naden (2021).

Naden (2021) lists the languages of the Southern/Eastern Mabia group as Dagbani, Hanga, Kantoosi, Kamara, Kusaal (Kusasi), Mampruli (Mamprusi), Nabit, Nanun/Nanuni (also considered a dialect of Dagbani), and Talni.

Comparative vocabulary
Sample basic vocabulary of Gur languages:

Note: In table cells with slashes, the singular form is given before the slash, while the plural form follows the slash.

Numerals
Comparison of numerals in individual languages:

References

 Manessy, Gabriel (1968/71) 'Langues voltaïques sans classes' in Actes du huitième congres international de linguistique africaine. [Congress was 1968, proceedings published 1971] Abidjan, Université d'Abidjan, 335-346.
 Naden, Anthony J. (1989) 'Gur', in Bendor-Samuel, John & Hartell, Rhonda L. (eds) The Niger–Congo languages. A classification and description of Africa's largest language family. Lanham, New York, London: University Press of America, 140-168.
 Roncador, Manfred von; Miehe, Gudrun (1998) Les langues gur (voltaïques). Bibliographie commentée et inventaire des appelations des langues. Köln: Rüdiger Köppe Verlag.
Williamson, Kay & Blench, Roger (2000) 'Niger–Congo', in Heine, Bernd & Nurse, Derek (eds.) African languages: an introduction, Cambridge: Cambridge University Press, 11-42.

External links
 Journal of West African Languages: Gur languages
Proto-Gur Swadesh lists (Gabriel Manessy 1969, 1975, 1979)

Volta–Congo languages
Dagbon